Macedonians in Croatia refers to the group of ethnic Macedonians who reside in Croatia. According to the official census of 2011, there are 4,138 ethnic Macedonians in Croatia.

Macedonians are recognised as an autochthonous national minority, and as such they elect a special representative to the Croatian Parliament, shared with members of four other national minorities.

Migration 
Macedonians had been migrating to Croatia since SFR Yugoslavia. Early migration was primarily of Macedonians from a rural background. These migrants have been joined by many newer business migrants who have come to Croatia for the opportunities offered. Many settled in the national capital Zagreb, and the Istria region. Macedonian communities can be also found in larger towns such as Osijek, Pula, and Zadar.

Culture 
The main Macedonian cultural association in Croatia is the Macedonian Community in Republic of Croatia. It was founded in 1992 and it branches over six other smaller organisations from the major cities where Macedonians reside. The Cultural associations are as follows; KUD-Ohridski Biser from Zagreb, KUD-Makedonija from Split, KUD-Biljana from Zadar, KUD-Brak Miladinov from Osijek, KUD-Ilinden from Rijeka and KUD-Kočo Racin from Pula.

The associations encourage traditional Macedonian folklore and customs from the motherland. They also encourage the upkeep of Macedonian heritage, language and traditions in Croatia.

Religion 
Macedonians in Croatia are predominantly adherents to the Macedonian Orthodox Church . There are four organised church communities which are abbreviated to the MPCO. The four Communities are St. Zlata Meglenska of Zagreb, St.Naum of Ohrid in Split, St.Joachim of Osogovo of Pula and St.Tsar Constantin and Tsaritsa Elena of Rijeka. Father Kiro Velinski holds liturgy in Zagreb and Split.

Media 
There are several Macedonian language newspapers operating in Croatia. The most prominent is Makedonski glas (meaning Macedonian voice) which has been in print since the 1990s. It is printed with financial assistance from the Croatian government.

Macedonians by counties and cities

Notable Macedonian Croatians 
Ljupka Dimitrovska - singer
Ljiljana Nikolovska - singer
Aki Rahimovski - singer
Ordan Petlevski - artist
Sibila Petlevski - author
Goce Sedloski - football manager, former footballer
Branko Trajkov - drummer
Kostadinka Velkovska - actor

See also  
 Croatia–North Macedonia relations

References

External links 
Union of Macedonians in Zagreb
Community of Macedonians in Croatia

Ethnic groups in Croatia
Macedonian diaspora